The Ambassador from Israel to Peru is Israel's foremost diplomatic representative in Peru.

List of ambassadors
Eran Yuvan 2022 - 
Asaf Ichilevich 2018 - 2022
Raphael Singer 2016 - 2018
Ehud Eitam 2014 - 2016
Modi Ephraim 2011 - 2014
Yoav Bar-On 2009 - 2011
Walid Mansour 2005 - 2009
Ori Noy 2002 - 2005
Rafael Eldad 1998 - 2002
David Tourgeman 1986 - 1988
Gideon Tadmor 1979 - 1986
Michael Michael (diplomat) 1975 - 1979
Moshe Avidan 1971 - 1975
Moshe Yuval 1967 - 1971
Michael Simon (diplomat) 1960 - 1963
Tuvia Arazi 1956 - 1960

References

Peru
Israel